Girolamo Dandini (1509 – 4 December 1559) was an Italian cardinal and the first to serve as Cardinal Secretary of State in the Roman Curia. By the time of Pope Innocent X (1644–1655), the secretary of state was always a cardinal, and Pope Innocent XII (1691–1700) abolished the office of cardinal nephew in 1692.

Biography
Dandini was born in Cesena on 25 March 1509 to a patrician family, the son of Anselmo Dandini and Giovanna Muratini. He graduated from the University of Bologna with a degree utroque iuris in both canon and civil law. He went to Rome and became secretary to Pope Paul III, who appointed him Protonotary apostolic.

He was sent as nuncio to the court of François I to negotiate peace and to agree on the celebration of a general council, June 1543 to May 1544. He was appointed bishop of Caserta, (14 November 1545), then bishop of Imola (17 May 1546), where he was abbot in commendam of San Firmino. He renounced the see in favour of his nephew, Anastasio Umberto Dandini, who died unexpectedly in 1558, whereupon Cesare Dandini took up the see once more and held it until his death the following year.  in the meantime he was again nuncio in France, charged with opposing royal support of Protestantism at the court of the new king, Henri II, July 1546 to September 1547. As legate to Emperor Charles V he negotiated the continuation of the Council of Trent and obtained assistance for the war of Parma and Mirandola. He was named to the lucrative post of commissary general of the papal army.

Dandini was created cardinal by Pope Julius III, in the consistory of 20 November 1551, and was made cardinal-secretary of state, to fill the post of the incompetent cardinal-nephew Innocenzo Ciocchi del Monte.

He participated in the Conclaves of 1555; in the Conclave of 1559 he had to retire from the conclave of 1559 because of illness and died in his palazzo near the Church of San Marcello, where he is buried.

References

External links and additional sources
  

 

16th-century Italian cardinals
16th-century Italian Roman Catholic bishops
Bishops of Caserta
Bishops of Imola
1509 births
1559 deaths
Cardinal Secretaries of State